The Audenried Tunnel (also known as the Audenried Mine Tunnel) is a drainage tunnel located in East Union Township, Schuylkill County, Pennsylvania, in the United States. It is approximately three miles long and drains the western portion of a coal basin near Kelayres. It is among the largest sources of acid mine drainage into Catawissa Creek. It also contributes up to 80% of the acidity to Catawissa Creek. The Audenried Tunnel's pH is approximately 4. However, there have been somewhat successful attempts at treating the tunnel outflow in the 21st century. The bedrock in the vicinity of the tunnel is mostly shale and sandstone.

Location and description
The tunnel runs between the Audenried Mine and the watershed of Catawissa Creek. It is filled with debris and the air inside the tunnel is not breathable. The tunnel roughly follows the synclinal axis of the coal basin it is in. The tunnel drains the Jeansville Coal Basin, which is located between Hazleton and McAdoo.

When the Audenried Tunnel was first built, the first  were fully lined with timber due to the low quality of the rock in that part of the tunnel. The next  were also supported by timber, but to a lesser extent.

In 1931, the Glen Alden Coal Company reported that  from the mouth of the Audenried Tunnel, there was a fissure that discharged close to 800 gallons (approximately 211 liters) per minute. It is possible that there is a fault at this location.

The Audenried Tunnel is the most downstream mine drainage tunnel to discharge into Catawissa Creek.

Hydrology
The Audenried Tunnel discharges into Catawissa Creek near where the Green Mountain Tunnel and the Catawissa Tunnel discharge into the creek. The Audenried Tunnel discharges in a strip mine not far from Catawissa Creek's headwaters. All of the mine workings in the Jeansville Coal Basin likely drain into the tunnel, as does some water from the surface. The discharge from the Audenried Tunnel contributes currently as much as 80% of the acid flowing through Catawissa Creek, with previous studies showing up to 84%. The average discharge of the tunnel is 12.22 million gallons per day, or about 8500 gallons per minute. However, during heavy rainstorms, the discharge can reach 300,000 gallons per minute. The pH of the water in the tunnel ranges between 3.8 and 4.1. The average pH is 4.03.

The total maximum daily load for manganese is 73% less than the current daily load. The total concentration of sulfates in the discharge is 136.25 milligrams per liter.

History
The Glen Alden Coal Company commenced construction of the Audenried Tunnel in 1928. Construction of the tunnel finished in 1931. The tunnel was originally created to decrease the elevation of the area's water table without resorting to the use of pumps, thus allowing the drilling of deep coal mine shafts. It was successful in doing this, but rendered  of Catawissa Creek devoid of life for 75 years.

An attempt was made to map the Audenried Tunnel in 1971. However, the attempt was aborted after  due to the presence of debris that was impassible. Plans were made in 1974 to plug the tunnel.

In 2006, part of the treatment plant at the mouth of the Audenried Tunnel was buried by a landslide, putting it out of commission.

Attempts at restoration and treatment
One plan to reduce the discharge rate of the Audenried Tunnel is to reclaim land and create stream channels for Hunkydory Creek and two unnamed tributaries of Catawissa Creek. There are plans to test a way to neutralize the water in the Audenried Tunnel. The Audenried Tunnel AMD Treatment Project began in the summer of 2005, with the aim of treating the outflow of the Audenried Tunnel. The Eastern Pennsylvania Coalition for Abandoned Mine Reclamation gained $150,000 from the Office of Surface Mining for the project. The treatment cost approximately $1,900,000 and is the largest acid mine drainage treatment system in the Coal Region. Around 2000, plans were made to reroute Catawissa Creek away from the tunnel.

The tanks are filled with 4500 tons of limestone. The treatment system raises the pH of the water by 30%. Ed Rendell, the governor of Pennsylvania when this project was worked on, granted $200,000 to the project.

Geology
The bedrock around the Audenried Tunnel includes red shale, sandy shale, which are both clay-like or silt-like. The shale is more weathered near the mouth of the tunnel. The bedrock near the tunnel also includes sandstone belonging to the Mauch Chunk Formation.

However, there is also a  layer of conglomerate.

See also
Catawissa Tunnel coal mining drainage in Schuylkill County
Green Mountain Tunnel coal mining drainage in Schuylkill County
Jeddo Tunnel coal mining drainage in Luzerne County
Oneida Number One Tunnel coal mining drainage in Schuylkill County
Oneida Number Three Tunnel coal mining drainage in Schuylkill County
Quakake Tunnel coal mining drainage in Carbon County

References

External links
Image of the cross section of the Audenried Tunnel

Drainage tunnels in the United States
Tunnels in Pennsylvania
Transportation buildings and structures in Luzerne County, Pennsylvania
Coal mining in the United States
Mining in Pennsylvania
Environment of Pennsylvania
Tributaries of Catawissa Creek
1931 establishments in Pennsylvania
Tunnels completed in 1931